Sally Patricia Cockburn (born 1947) is a mathematician whose research ranges from algebraic topology and set theory to geometric graph theory and combinatorial optimization.  A Canadian immigrant to the US, she is William R. Kenan Jr. Professor of Mathematics at Hamilton College, and former chair of the mathematics department at Hamilton.

Education and career
Cockburn is originally from Ottawa. She earned a bachelor's and master's degree from Queen's University in Ontario, in 1982 and 1984 respectively, and also has a master's degree from the University of Ottawa.
She completed her Ph.D. in algebraic topology in 1991 from Yale University. Her dissertation, The Gamma-Filtration on Extra-Special P-Groups, was supervised by Ronnie Lee.

She joined the Hamilton College faculty in 1991, and was promoted to full professor in 2014. At Hamilton, she has also served as the coach for the college's squash team.

Recognition
Cockburn won the 2014 Carl B. Allendoerfer Award of the Mathematical Association of America with Joshua Lesperance for their joint work, "deranged socks", on a variation of the problem of counting derangements.

References

1960 births
Living people
Canadian mathematicians
20th-century American mathematicians
21st-century American mathematicians
American women mathematicians
Canadian women mathematicians
Queen's University at Kingston alumni
University of Ottawa alumni
Yale Graduate School of Arts and Sciences alumni
Hamilton College (New York) faculty
20th-century women mathematicians
21st-century women mathematicians
Mathematicians from New York (state)
20th-century American women
21st-century American women